Lepidoneura grisealis is a moth in the family Crambidae. It was described by George Hampson in 1900. It is found in Xinjiang, China.

References

Moths described in 1900
Spilomelinae